Zeytintaşı Cave is a show cave in Antalya Province, southwestern Turkey. It is a registered natural monument of the country.

The cave is located at Akbaş village in Serik district of Antalya Province. Tourist attraction Aspendos is  far from the cave.

The cave is enclosed in impermeable limestone formation of Jurassic-Cretaceous period. It was formed on a distinct fault line in northwest-southeast direction. It features still active stalactites,  stalagmites and columns. as well as soda straws of  thickness and  length. There are pools between columns.

The cave was discovered by the Turkish Highway Administration during preliminary works for road construction in 1997. The upper gallery was opened to public visit as a show cave in 2002. The soda straws inside the cave make it a rare example.

References

Show caves in Turkey
Natural monuments of Turkey
Caves of Antalya Province
Protected areas established in 2013
2013 establishments in Turkey
Serik District
Tourist attractions in Antalya Province